Patrick Aidan Heelan, S.J. (17 March 1926 – 1 February 2015) was an Irish Jesuit priest, physicist, and philosopher of science. He was William A. Gaston Professor of Philosophy at Georgetown University.

Biography 

Patrick A. Heelan was born in Dublin to an Irish father and a Belgian mother. He joined the Society of Jesus at 16, received his B.A. in 1947 and his M.A. in 1948, all with first-class honors, in mathematics and mathematical physics at University College, Dublin during which time he also worked with Erwin Schrödinger and John Synge at the Dublin Institute for Advanced Studies both mathematicians famous for their work in general relativity and cosmology. In 1948, he won a prestigious travelling studentship from the National University of Ireland, funding doctoral studies abroad. His superior directed him to take his doctorate in geophysics and seismology at the Institute of Geophysics at St. Louis University as a junior Jesuit scholastic, where he specialised in the philosophy of science with a concentration on the philosophy of modern physics with a novel approach from the phenomenological and hermeneutical perspective of Husserl and Heidegger. From 1953 to 1954, Heelan worked as a research associate in theoretical physics at the Dublin Institute for Advanced Studies. He returned there again as a research associate in cosmic physics from 1964 to 1965.

He then taught physics at UCD for several years before being asked by the Archbishop of Dublin to teach the philosophy of science. Patrick Heelan's sense that he needed more philosophy for this brought him, in two steps, first to an encounter with Bernard Lonergan's 1957 book Insight (starting with the original notes in Latin), and then after a two-year post-doc working with Eugene Wigner at Princeton University (1960–62), which also gave him, at the start his first experience at Fordham University, Dr Heelan returned to Europe to pursue a second doctorate in philosophy (September 1962 – 1964) at the Catholic University of Louvain at Leuven (in Belgium) where he worked with Jean Ladrière, studying both logic and Husserlian philosophy (Ladrière would write the biographical entries on Patrick Heelan, including his first book, for the French Encyclopédie Philosophique Universelle). He defended his dissertation (with félications du jury) and published Quantum Mechanics and Objectivity in 1965 (Martinus Nijhoff Publishers, Table of Contents and Preface). During the same period he began his visits and correspondence with Werner Heisenberg himself at the Max-Planck Institute for Physics and Astrophysics in Munich, a contact Heelan maintained until Heisenberg's death in 1976.

In 1965, Heelan joined the philosophy department at Fordham University. He would leave in 1970 at the invitation of John Toll, then the president of State University of New York at Stony Brook, to chair (and to build) the department of philosophy where over the next 22 years he would also fill several major positions in the administration of the university. He published his second major study, Space Perception and the Philosophy of Science with the University of California Press in 1983, which examines the geometry of vision including the space of art and experience and draws on Husserl, Heidegger, and Merleau-Ponty. He came to Georgetown University as executive vice-president for the main campus in 1992 and in 1995, he became the William A. Gaston Professor of Philosophy. The year of 2002, saw the publication of a festschrift, edited by Babette Babich, Hermeneutic Philosophy of Science, Van Gogh's Eyes, and God: Essays in Honor of Patrick A. Heelan, S.J. which appeared as Volume 225 in the Boston Studies in the Philosophy of Science. His third book, The Observable, also edited by Babette Babich came out in 2016 although written almost a half a century before; completed while Heisenberg was still living, it dealt with Heisenberg, Bohr, and Pauli, in addition to Einstein. Patrick Heelan, who continued to write and to teach until he retired from the philosophy department in 2013, returned to Dublin in 2014. He died in Dublin in 2015.

Main publications

Books 

 Quantum Mechanics and Objectivity (Nijhoff: The Hague, 1965).
 Space Perception and the Philosophy of Science (Berkeley: University of California Press, 1983).
 The Observable – Heisenberg's Philosophy of Quantum Mechanics (New York: Peter Lang Publishing, Inc., 2016)

Selected articles 

 "Consciousness, Quantum Physics, and Hermeneutical Phenomenology." In: Babette Babich and Dimitri Ginev (Eds.) The Multidimensionality of Hermeneutic Phenomenology, 91 Contributions to Phenomenology 70 (Frankfurt am Main: Springer 2014).  91- 112.
 "The Role of Consciousness as Meaning-Maker in Science, Culture, and Religion."  Zygon 44 (2009): 467–486.
 "The phenomenological role of consciousness in measurement."  Mind and Matter.  Vol. 2 (1) (2004): 61–68.
 "Faith and Reason in Philosophical Perspective." In: J.-F. Malherbe (Ed.)  La Responsibilité de la raison: Hommage à Jean Ladrière.  (Leuven: Peeters, 2002).  149–175. 
 "Lifeworld and Scientific Interpretation."  In: S. Kay Toombs (Ed.) Handbook of Phenomenology and Medicine.  Vol. 68 of Philosophy and Medicine.  (Dordrecht: Kluwer, 2002).  47–66.
 "Phenomenology and the Philosophy of the Natural Sciences."  In: A-T. Tymieniecka (Ed.)  Phenomenology World-Wide.  (Dordrecht: Kluwer, 2002).  631–641.
 "Hermeneutics and Natural Science."  In:  James R. Watson (ed.)  Continental Philosophers in America.  (Bloomington: Indiana UP, 1999).  64–73.
 "Nietzsche's Perspectivalism and the Philosophy of Science."  In: Babette E. Babich and Robert S. Cohen (Eds.)  Nietzsche, Epistemology, and the Philosophy of Science.  Vol. 2.  Vol. 204 of Boston Studies in the Philosophy of Science.  (Dordrecht: Kluwer, 1999).  193–209. 
 "The Authority of Science: a Post-Modern Crisis."  Studia Culturologica: Divinatio 6 (1998): 3–17.
 "Hermeneutical Philosophy and Pragmatism: a Philosophy of Science."  (with Jay Schulkin)  Synthese 115 (1998): 269–302.
 "Scope of Hermeneutics in the Philosophy of Natural Science."  Studies in the History and Philosophy of Science 29 (1998): 273–298.
 "Why a Hermeneutical Philosophy of Natural Science?"  In: Robert Crease (Ed.)  Hermeneutics and the Natural Sciences.  Dordrecht: Kluwer 1997. 13–40.  Rpt. in Man and World 30 (1997): 271–298.
 "Context, Hermeneutics, and Ontology in the Experimental Sciences."  In: Dimitri Ginev and Robert S. Cohen (Eds.) Issues and Images in the Philosophy of Science.  Vol. 192 of Boston Studies in the Philosophy of Science Series.  (Dordrecht: Kluwer, 1997).  107–126.
 After Post-Modernism: The Scope of Hermeneutics in Natural Science
 "An Anti-Epistemological or Ontological Interpretation of the Quantum Theory and Theories Like it."  In: Babette E. Babich, D. Bergoffen, and S. Glynn (Eds.)  Continental and Postmodern Perspectives in the Philosophy of Science.  (Aldershot: Avebury, 1995).  55–68.
 "Quantum Mechanics and the Social Sciences: After Hermeneutics."  Science and Education 4 (1995): 127–136. 
 "Galileo, Luther, and the Hermeneutics of Natural Science."  The Question of Hermeneutics: Festschrift for Joseph Kockelmans.  Ed. Timothy Stapleton.  (Dordrecht: Kluwer, 1994).  363–375.
 "Experiment as Fulfillment of Theory."  In: D. P. Chattopadhyaha and J. N. Mohanty (eds.)  Phenomenology and Indian Philosophy.  (New Delhi: Indian Council of Philosophical Research, 1992).  169–184.
 "Hermeneutical Phenomenology and the History of Science."  In: Daniel Dahlstrom (Ed.)  Nature and Scientific Method: William A. Wallace Festschrift.  (Washington, D.C.: Catholic U of America P, 1991). 23–36.
 "Hermeneutic Phenomenology and the Philosophy of Science."  In: Hugh Silverman (Ed.)  Gadamer and Hermeneutics: Science, Culture, and Literature.  Vol. 4 of Continental Philosophy.  (London: Routledge, 1991).  213–228.
 "The New Relevance of Experiment: a Postmodern Problem."  In: Lee Hardy and Lester Embree (Eds.)  Phenomenology of Natural Science.  (Dordrecht: Kluwer 1991).  197–213.
 "After Experiment: Research and Reality."  Amer. Philos. Qrtly.  26 (1989): 297–308.
 "Husserl's Philosophy of Science."   In: J. Mohanty and W. McKenna (Eds.) Husserl's Phenomenology: a Textbook.  (Pittsburgh and Washington, D.C.: CARP and University Press of America, 1989).  387–428.
 "Philosophy and Synoptic Understanding." The World & I 4 (1989): 450–455.
 "Space Perception and a Hermeneutic Phenomenology of Natural Science."  In: Eugene Kaelin and Carl Schrag (Eds.)  Phenomenology in America.  (Dordrecht: Kluwer, 1989).  216–220.
 "Yes!  There is a Hermeneutic Philosophy of Natural Science: Rejoinder to Markus."  Science in Context 3 (1989): 469–480.
 "Experiment and Theory: Constitution and Reality."  Journal of Philosophy 85 (1988): 515–524.
 "A Heideggerian Meditation on Science and Art."  In: Joseph J. Kockelmans (Ed.)  Hermeneutic Phenomenology.  (Washington, D.C. and Pittsburgh: UP of America and CARP, 1988).  257–275.
 "Husserl, Hilbert and the Critique of Galilean Science."  In: Robert Sokolowski (Ed.)  Edmund Husserl and the Phenomenological Tradition.  (Washington, D.C.: Catholic University of America Press, 1988).  157–173.
 "The Primacy of Perception and the Cognitive Paradigm: Reply to De Mey."  Social Epistemology 1 (1988): 321–326.
 "Husserl's Later Philosophy of Science."  Philosophy of Science 54 (1987): 368–390.
 "Perceived Worlds are Interpreted Worlds."  In: Robert Neville (Ed.) New Essays in Metaphysics  (Albany: SUNY Press 1987).  61–76.
 "Interpretation and the Structure of Space in Scientific Theory and in Perception."  Research in Phenomenology XVI (1986):  187–199.
 "Natural Science as a Hermeneutic of Instrumentation."  Philosophy of Science 50 (1983): 181–204.
 "Natural Science and Being-in-the-World."  Man and World 16 (1983): 207–216.
 "Perception as a Hermeneutical Act."  Review of Metaphysics 37 (1983): 61–76. Rpt. in: Hugh Silverman and Don Ihde (Eds.) Hermeneutics and Deconstruction.  Vol. 10 of Proceedings of the Society for Phenomenological and Existential Philosophy.  (Albany: SUNY Press, 1985).   43–54.
 "Space as God's Presence."  Journal of Dharma 8 (1983): 63–86.  Rpt. in Religious Experience and Scientific Paradigms.  Stony Brook, NY: Institute for Advanced Studies of World Religions, 1985. 24–60.  Rpt. in The World and I 1 (1986): 607–623.
 "Is Visual Space Euclidean?  A Study in the Hermeneutics of Perception."  Abstracts of the Seventh International Congress on the Logic, Methodology, and Philosophy of Science.  Sec. 10, Vol. 5.  Salzburg 1983.  40–43.
 "Hermeneutical Realism and Scientific Observation."  PSA  Ed. Peter Asquith and Ron Giere.  Lansing, MI: Philosophy of Science Association, Michigan State University, (1982):  77–87.
 "Continental Philosophy and the Philosophy of Science."  In: Peter Asquith and Fred Suppe (Eds.) Current Research in the Philosophy of Science.  East Lansing, MI: Philosophy of Science Association, 1979.  84–93.
 "Lattice of Growth in Knowledge."  In: Gerard Radnitzky and Gunther Andersson (Eds.)  Structure and Development of Knowledge.  Vol. 59.  Boston Studies in the Philosophy of Science.  (Dordrecht: Reidel, 1979).  205–211.
 "The Nature of Clinical Science."  Journal of Medicine and Philosophy 2 (1977): 20–32.
 "Quantum Relativity and the Cosmic Observer."  In:  and Andrew Breck (Eds.)  Cosmology, History and Theology.  (New York: Plenum, 1977). 29–38.
 "Heisenberg and Radical Theoretic Change."  Zeitschrift für allgemeine Wissenschaftstheorie 6 (1975): 113–138.
 "Logic of Changing Classificatory Frameworks."  In: Joseph Wojciechowski (Ed.)  Proceedings of International Conference on the Classification of Knowledge.  (Munich: Verlag Documentation, 1974).  260–274.
 "Hermeneutics of Experimental Science in the Context of the Life-World."  Philosophia Mathematica 9 (1972): 101–144.  Rpt. in: Don Ihde and Richard Zaner (Eds.) Interdisciplinary Phenomenology.  (The Hague: Nijhoff 1975). 7–50.
 "Towards a New Analysis of the Pictorial Space of Vincent van Gogh." Art Bulletin 54 (1972), 478–492.
 "Toward a Hermeneutic of Natural Science."  Journal of the British Society of Phenomenology 3 (1972): 252–60.
 "Toward a Hermeneutics of Science."  Main Currents 28 (1972): 85–93.
 "The Logic of Framework Transpositions."  International Philosophical Quarterly 11 (1971): 314–334.
 "Quantum Logic and Classical Logic: their Respective Roles."  Synthese 22 (1970): 3–33.
 "Scientific Objectivity and Framework Transpositions."  Philosophical Studies 19 (1970): 55–70.
 "Logic, Language and Science."  In: Edward MacKinnon (ed.)  Philosophical Aspects of Scientific Realism  (New York: Appleton, 1970).  260–284. "
 The Role of Subjectivity in Natural Science."  Proceedings of the American Catholic Philosophical Association 1969.  185–194.
 "Horizon, Objectivity and Reality in the Physical Sciences."  International Philosophical Quarterly 7 (1967): 375–412.
 "Epistemological Realism in Contemporary Physics."  In: Walter Stokes (Ed.)  Proceedings of 29th Annual Convention of the Jesuit Philosophical Association.   (East Dubuque, IL: Tel Graphics, 1967). 9–66.
 "A Realist Theory of Physical Science." Continuum 2 (1964): 34–42.

Sources

References

Georgetown University faculty
Christian clergy from Dublin (city)
1926 births
2015 deaths
Irish physicists
Irish philosophers
Alumni of University College Dublin
Catholic University of Leuven (1834–1968) alumni
Saint Louis University physicists
Academics of University College Dublin
Academics of the Dublin Institute for Advanced Studies